James Craig VC (10 September 1824 – 18 March 1861) was a Scottish recipient of the Victoria Cross, the highest and most prestigious award for gallantry in the face of the enemy that can be awarded to British and Commonwealth forces.

Craig was a former serjeant in the Scots Fusilier Guards, who had been commissioned as an ensign in 3rd Battalion, Military Train, British Army during the Crimean War. He was 30 years old, and serving as battalion adjutant when he carried out the action which is described in his citation for the award of the Victoria Cross, which was gazetted on 20 November 1857.

He later achieved the rank of lieutenant.

His Victoria Cross is displayed at The Guards Regimental Headquarters (Scots Guards RHQ) in Wellington Barracks, London, England.

References

Monuments to Courage (David Harvey, 1999)
The Register of the Victoria Cross (This England, 1997)
Scotland's Forgotten Valour (Graham Ross, 1995)

External links
 

British recipients of the Victoria Cross
Crimean War recipients of the Victoria Cross
British Army personnel of the Crimean War
Scots Guards soldiers
1824 births
1861 deaths
Royal Army Service Corps officers
British military personnel who committed suicide
Suicides by drowning
British Army recipients of the Victoria Cross
Military personnel from Perth, Scotland
Burials in South Africa